Giacomo Libera (born 7 October 1951 in Varese) is a retired Italian professional footballer who played as a forward or midfielder.

1951 births
Living people
Italian footballers
Serie A players
Como 1907 players
S.S.D. Varese Calcio players
Inter Milan players
Atalanta B.C. players
Calcio Foggia 1920 players
S.S.C. Bari players
Association football forwards